Gekko stoliczkai is a species of gecko. It is endemic to the Nicobar Islands.

References

Gekko
Reptiles described in 2021
Reptiles of India
Endemic fauna of India